The 2014–15 Norfolk State Spartans men's basketball team represented Norfolk State University during the 2014–15 NCAA Division I men's basketball season. The Spartans, led by second year coach Robert Jones, played their home games at the Joseph G. Echols Memorial Hall and were members of the Mid-Eastern Athletic Conference. They finished the season 20–14, 12–4 in MEAC play to finish in second place. They advanced to the semifinals of the MEAC tournament where they lost to Hampton. They were invited to the CollegeInsider.com Tournament where they lost in the first round to Eastern Kentucky.

Roster

Schedule

|-
!colspan=9 style="background:#007A5E; color:#E6B012;"| Regular season

|-
!colspan=9 style="background:#007A5E; color:#E6B012;"| MEAC tournament

|-
!colspan=9 style="background:#007A5E; color:#E6B012;"| CIT

References

Norfolk State Spartans men's basketball seasons
Norfolk State
Norfolk State Spartans
Norfolk State
Norfolk State Spartans